Thomas Coventre may refer to:

Thomas Coventre (MP for Oxford), MP for Oxford (UK Parliament constituency), 1404-1435
Thomas Coventre (MP for Devizes) (died 1451), MP for Devizes, 1414 and 1425

See also
Thomas Coventry (disambiguation)